Andrzej Jan Bachleda-Curuś (born 21 January 1947 in Zakopane) is a Polish former alpine skier who competed in the 1968 Winter Olympics and 1972 Winter Olympics. In 1968 he finished 6th in slalom race.

External links
sports-reference.com

1947 births
Living people
Polish male alpine skiers
Olympic alpine skiers of Poland
Alpine skiers at the 1968 Winter Olympics
Alpine skiers at the 1972 Winter Olympics
Sportspeople from Zakopane
Recipients of the Order of Polonia Restituta
Universiade silver medalists for Poland
Universiade medalists in alpine skiing
Competitors at the 1966 Winter Universiade
Competitors at the 1970 Winter Universiade
Competitors at the 1972 Winter Universiade
20th-century Polish people